Faustino S. Aguilar (February 15, 1882 – July 24, 1955) is a pioneering Filipino novelist, journalist, revolutionary, union leader, and editor. Faustino was one of the first novelists in the Philippines to explore and present social realism through literature.

Career

As journalist
He was the editor of the Taliba, a newspaper in the Philippines.

As novelist
As a novelist, he authored the Tagalog-language novels Busabos ng Palad (Pauper of Fate) in 1909, Sa Ngalan ng Diyos (In the Name of God) in 1911, Ang Lihim ng Isang Pulo (The Secret of an Island) in 1926, Ang Patawad ng Patay (The Pardon of the Dead) in 1951, Ang Kaligtasan (The Salvation) in 1951, and Pinaglahuan (Place of Disappearance) in 1906 (published in 1907). As a revolutionary, Faustino was a member of the Katipunan.  His novels portrayed themes of ruthlessness and injustice in society.

As revolutionary
Aguilar became a Katipunan member when he was fourteen years old.

As civil servant
Aguilar worked in different branches of the Philippine government. One particular office is the Department of Labor.

References

1882 births
1955 deaths
Filipino novelists
Filipino editors
Tagalog-language writers
Filipino journalists
Katipunan members
Filipino revolutionaries
Filipino civil servants
People from Malate, Manila
Writers from Manila
Filipino trade union leaders
20th-century novelists
20th-century journalists